Don Budge and Alice Marble were the defending champions, but Budge was ineligible to compete after turning professional at the end of the 1938 season. Marble partnered with Bobby Riggs and defeated Frank Wilde and Nina Brown in the final, 9–7, 6–1 to win the mixed doubles tennis title at the 1939 Wimbledon Championships.

Seeds

  Elwood Cooke /  Sarah Fabyan (semifinals)
  Bobby Riggs /  Alice Marble (champions)
  Cam Malfroy /  Betty Nuthall (semifinals)
  Franjo Kukuljević /  Simonne Mathieu (fourth round)

Draw

Finals

Top half

Section 1

Section 2

Section 3

Section 4

Bottom half

Section 5

The nationality of GE Bean is unknown.

Section 6

Section 7

Section 8

References

External links

X=Mixed Doubles
Wimbledon Championship by year – Mixed doubles